Hallmark Place is an apartment building located at 311 6th Avenue North in the Central Business District of Saskatoon, Saskatchewan, Canada.  The building has 27 stories (78.8 m) and is the third tallest building in the city.  The building is a condominium development where, in addition to individual owners, a number of units are offered as short term business suites.

See also
List of tallest buildings in Saskatoon

References

External links
 Obasa Suites

Buildings and structures in Saskatoon
Residential condominiums in Canada
Residential skyscrapers in Canada
Residential buildings completed in 1984